Justus (died 627) was the fourth Archbishop of Canterbury. The given name may also refer to:

Religious and biblical figures
 Justus of Eleutheropolis or Joseph Barsabbas, in the New Testament the man not chosen by lot to take Judas Iscariot's place among the Apostles, later Bishop of Eleutheropolis and martyr
 Pope Justus of Alexandria, Pope of Alexandria (118-129) and a saint of the Coptic Orthodox Church
 Justus of Beauvais (c. 278—c. 287), semi-legendary Roman Catholic saint
 Justus of Trieste (died 293), Roman Catholic saint
 Justus (died c. 304), Christian martyr - see Justus and Pastor
 Justus of Lyon (died 389), 13th bishop of Lyon
 Justus of Urgell (died c. 527), Spanish bishop and saint

Other
 Justus of Tiberias, 1st-century Jewish author and historian
 Justus D. Barnes (1862–1946), American actor in The Great Train Robbery
 Justus Dahinden (1925–2020), Swiss architect, teacher, and writer
 Justus Falckner (1672–1723), Lutheran minister and first Lutheran pastor to be ordained within the United States
 Justus Frantz (born 1944), German pianist, conductor, and television personality
 Justus ǁGaroëb (born 1942), Namibian traditional leader and politician
 Justus van Gent (c. 1410–c. 1480), painter from Ghent
 Justus Hagman (1859–1936), Swedish actor 
 Justus Carl Hasskarl (1811–1894), German explorer and botanist 
 Justus Hecker (1795–1850), German physician and medical writer
 Justus Jonas (1493–1555), German Lutheran reformer
 Justus von Liebig (1803–1873), German chemist
 Justus Lipsius (1547–1606), philologist and humanist from Brabant
 Justis Ellis McQueen, Jr. (born 1927), stage name L. Q. Jones, American actor
 Justus Möser (1720–1794), German jurist and social theorist
 Justus Mühlenpfordt (1911–2000), German nuclear physicist
 Justus Perthes (1749–1816), original editor of the Almanach de Gotha, a directory of royalty and nobility
 Justus Cornelius Ramsey (1821–1881), American politician
 Justus Sheffield (born 1996), American baseball player
 Justus Smith Stearns (1845–1933), American lumber baron and Secretary of State of Michigan
 Justus Sustermans (1597–1681) Flemish painter
 Justus Thigpen (born 1947), American basketball player
 Justus Thorner (1848–1928), first owner of the professional baseball franchise now known as the Cincinnati Reds
 Justus Velsius (c. 1510–after 1581), Dutch humanist, physician, and mathematician
 Justus Vingboons (c. 1620–c. 1698), Amsterdam architect

Fictional characters
 Justus Ward, on the American soap opera General Hospital

See also
 Justice (given name)

Latin masculine given names